Chennasamudram is a town in Vellore district  in the state of Tamil Nadu, India.

Etymology
Chennasamudram is made from two words, Chenna meaning good and Samudram meaning sea. So the name means 'good sea'.

Demographics
 India census, Chennasamudram had a population of 7353. Males constitute 50% of the population and females 50%. Chennasamudram has an average literacy rate of 64%, higher than the national average of 59.5%; with male literacy of 75% and female literacy of 53%. 8% of the population is under 6 years of age.

References

Cities and towns in Erode district